The 2011–12 Alabama–Huntsville Chargers ice hockey team represents the University of Alabama in Huntsville in the 2011–12 NCAA Division I men's ice hockey season. The Chargers are coached by Chris Luongo who is in his second season as head coach. His assistant coaches are Gavin Morgan and Tim Flynn. The Chargers play their home games in the Propst Arena at the Von Braun Center and compete as an independent.

On October 24, 2011, interim UAH President Malcolm Portera announced that the 2011–12 season would be the school's final season competing at the NCAA Division I level, citing financial reasons.  The program would be "realigned" as a club team, and the coaches' jobs would be eliminated as of May 31, 2012.  New UAH president Dr. Robert Altenkirch reversed the decision after he and school administrators met with local supporters on December 6, 2011. UAH continued to play at the NCAA Division I level for the 2012–13 season. The school set up a campaign to raise funds for the program, with the goal of getting the Chargers into a conference.

Recruiting
UAH added 9 freshmen for the 2011–12 season, including 7 forwards and 2 defensemen:

Roster

Departures from 2010–11 team
 Matt Baxter, D – Graduation
 Vince Bruni, F – Graduation
 Ryan Burkholder, D – Graduation
 Trevor Conrad, D
 Keenan Desmet, F — FFHG Division 2 (Evry)
 Cody Dion, F — Suomi-sarja (S-Kiekko)
 Chris Fairbanks, F – Graduation
 Joe Koudys, F – Graduation
 Neil Ruffini, F – Graduation
 David Ruffini, F – Graduation
 David Way, F

2011–12 team
As of February 11, 2012

|}

Regular season

Schedule
  Green background indicates win.
  Red background indicates loss.
  Yellow background indicates tie.

Opponents by conference

Player stats
As of February 11, 2012

Skaters

Goaltenders

References

External links
 UAH Chargers Hockey website

Alabama–Huntsville Chargers men's ice hockey seasons
Alabama-Huntsville